Brian Charles Pilkington (born 20 July 1950) is an English-born Icelandic illustrator and artist, best known for his illustrations of many Icelandic children's books since the 1980s. Pilkington has also illustrated other literature genres, including his own book of Icelandic fauna (Dýraríki Íslands (1992)).

Pilkington was born and raised in Liverpool, England, and graduated from the School of Arts of the University of Leicester. He moved to Iceland in 1974 where he soon found work in the advertising industry there. His first notable illustration work came about in 1981 when he was commissioned by the Icelandic author Guðrún Helgadóttir to illustrate her children's book Ástarsaga úr fjöllunum.

Pilkington has received several accolades for his work. In 1999 his book Allt um tröll (released in English as Icelandic Trolls) was recognised by the Icelandic Tourism Board as the best idea for a souvenir from Iceland. He has also received the Dimmalimm award for the book Mánasteina í vasanum and was nominated for the Reykjavik Children's Book Prize for his book Jólakötturinn tekinn í gegn.

List of illustrations (incomplete) 
 Ástarsaga úr fjöllunum (1981), written by Guðrún Helgadóttir
 Bakkabræður (1989)
 Á baðkari til Betlehem (1990), written by Sigurður G. Valgeirsson & Sveinbjörn I. Baldvinsson
 Jóladýrin, written by Gerður Kristný
 Blómin á þakinu written by Ingibjörg Sigurðardóttir
 Jólin okkar
 Konungur háloftanna
 Mánasteinar í vasanum

See also 

 List of Icelandic artists
 List of illustrators

References

British children's book illustrators
Artists from Liverpool
1950 births
Living people